Ronald Craig Kutschinski (born August 28, 1947, in Grand Rapids, Michigan) is an American middle-distance runner who competed in the 1968 Summer Olympics.

References

1947 births
Living people
American male middle-distance runners
Olympic track and field athletes of the United States
Sportspeople from Grand Rapids, Michigan
Track and field athletes from Michigan
Athletes (track and field) at the 1968 Summer Olympics